Through the Fire is a 2005 documentary film. The film focuses on Sebastian Telfair as he goes through his senior year at Abraham Lincoln High School in New York City. Throughout the film, Sebastian is faced with the choice between college in Louisville or making the jump from high school to the NBA.

Synopsis
Since the age of nine, Sebastian Telfair has been a well known player on the basketball courts in his hometown of Brooklyn. Now entering his senior year of high school, Sebastian is determined to get his team, the Lincoln Railsplitters, to their third straight PSAL championship title. He is also faced with the decision to either attend The University of Louisville or make the jump from high school to the NBA in order to provide for his family and get them out of the projects of New York City. Telfair's environment also plays a big part in his life. He deals with a death and having the entire neighborhood depending on him to be next in the line of great New York point guards.

Awards
2005 AFI Fest - Audience Award for Best Documentary
2005 Urbanworld Film Festival - Best Documentary Feature

External links 
 
 
 

2005 films
Documentary films about basketball
Films shot in New York City
2000s English-language films